Boneta is an unincorporated community in east-central Duchesne County, Utah, United States.

History
A post office called Boneta was established in 1908, and remained in operation until 1960. The community's name is derived from the first child death in the community, her named being Boneta.

See also

References

External links

Unincorporated communities in Duchesne County, Utah
Unincorporated communities in Utah